GitLab Inc. is an open-core company that operates GitLab, a DevOps software package which can develop, secure, and operate software. The open source software project was created by Ukrainian developer Dmytro Zaporozhets and Dutch developer Sytse Sijbrandij.  In 2018, GitLab Inc. was considered the first partly-Ukrainian unicorn.
 
Since its foundation, GitLab Inc. promoted remote work, and is known to be among the largest all-remote companies in the world. GitLab has an estimated 30 million registered users, with 1 million being active licensed users.

Overview 

GitLab Inc. was established in 2014 to continue the development of the open-source code-sharing platform launched in 2011 by Dmytro Zaporozhets. The company's other co-founder Sytse Sijbrandij initially contributed to the project and, by 2012, decided to build a business around it. GitLab offers its platform as a freemium. Since its foundation, GitLab Inc. has been an all-remote company. By 2020, the company employed 1300 people in 65 countries. 

Until 2019, the company used a no-vetting policy for customers (except when required by law) and banned political discussions in the workplace but relaxed the restrictions in response to criticism.

History 

The company participated in the Y Combinator seed accelerator Winter 2015 program. By 2015 notable customers included Alibaba Group and IBM.

During January of 2017, a database administrator accidentally deleted the production database in the aftermath of a cyber attack, causing the loss of a substantial amount of issue and merge request data. The recovery process was live-streamed on YouTube.

In April 2018, GitLab Inc. announced integration with Google Kubernetes Engine (GKE) to simplify the process of spinning up a new cluster to deploy applications.

In May 2018, GNOME moved to GitLab with over 400 projects and 900 contributors.

On August 1, 2018, GitLab Inc. started development of Meltano.
 
On August 11, 2018, GitLab Inc. moved from Microsoft Azure to Google Cloud Platform, making the service inaccessible to users in several regions including: Crimea, Cuba, Iran, North Korea, Sudan, and Syria, due to sanctions imposed by Office of Foreign Assets Control of the United States.  In order to overcome this issue, the non-profit organisation Framasoft provides a Debian mirror to make GitLab CE available in those countries.
 
In 2020, due to the COVID-19 pandemic, GitLab Inc. released its Guide to All-Remote and a course on remote management to aid companies in building all-remote work cultures.

April 2020 saw the expansion of GitLab Inc. into the Australian and Japanese markets. In November that same year, GitLab Inc. was valued at more than $6 billion in a secondary market evaluation.

In 2021, OMERS participated in a secondary shares investment in GitLab Inc.

On June 2, 2021, GitLab Inc. also acquired UnReview, a tool that automates software review cycles.

On March 18, 2021, GitLab Inc. licensed its technology to Chinese company JiHu.

On June 30, 2021, GitLab Inc. spun out Meltano, an open source ELT platform.

On July 23, 2021, GitLab Inc. open-sourced Package Hunter, a Falco-based tool that detects malicious code.

On August 4, 2022, GitLab's plans to change its Data Retention Policy and automatically delete inactive repositories that have not been modified for a year became public. As a result, in the following days GitLab received much criticism from the open source community. Shortly after, it was announced that dormant projects would not be deleted, and would instead remain accessible in an archived state, potentially using a slower type of storage.

Fundraising 
GitLab Inc. initially raised $1.5 million in seed funding. 

Subsequent funding rounds include:

 September 2015 - $4 million in Series A funding from Khosla Ventures.
 September 2016 - $20 million in Series B funding from August Capital and others.
 October 2016 - $20 million in Series C funding from GV and others.
 September 19, 2018 - $100 million in Series D-round funding led by ICONIQ Capital.
 2019 - $268 million in Series E-round funding led by Goldman Sachs and ICONIQ Capital at a valuation of $2.7 billion.

IPO 
On September 17, 2021, GitLab Inc. publicly filed a registration statement on Form S-1 with the U.S. Securities and Exchange Commission (SEC) relating to the proposed initial public offering of its Class A common stock. The firm began trading on the NASDAQ Global Select Market under the ticker "GTLB" on October 14, 2021.

Adoption 
GitLab Forge was officially adopted in 2023 by the French ministry for education to create a "Digital Educational Commons" of educational resources.

Acquisitions 
In March 2015, GitLab Inc. acquired Gitorious, a competing Git hosting service. Gitorious had at the time around 822,000 registered users. Users were encouraged to move to GitLab, and the Gitorious service was discontinued in June 2015.
 
On March 15, 2017, GitLab Inc. announced the acquisition of Gitter. Included in the announcement was the stated intent that Gitter would continue as a standalone project. Additionally, GitLab Inc. announced that the code would become open source under an MIT License no later than June 2017.

In January 2018, GitLab Inc. acquired Gemnasium, a service that provided security scanners with alerts for known security vulnerabilities in open-source libraries of various languages. The service was scheduled for complete shut-down on May 15. Gemnasium features and technology was integrated into GitLab EE and as part of CI/CD.

On June 11, 2020, GitLab Inc. acquired Peach Tech, a security software firm specializing in protocol fuzz testing, and Fuzzit. 

On December 14, 2021, GitLab Inc. announced that it had acquired Opstrace, Inc., developers of an open source software monitoring and observability distribution.

See also 
 Comparison of source-code-hosting facilities
 Collaborative software
 Gitea
 Kubernetes

References

External links

 

 

 
 
2021 initial public offerings
500 Startups companies
Bug and issue tracking software
Build automation
Collaborative projects
Concurrent Versions System
Continuous integration
Cross-platform free software
Distributed version control systems
Free project management software
Free software companies
Free software programmed in Ruby
Free version control software
Git (software)
Go (programming language) software
Open-source hosted development tools
Open-source software hosting facilities
Project hosting websites
Remote companies
Software using the MIT license
Technology companies of the Netherlands
Y Combinator companies
Companies listed on the Nasdaq